The UP Kantega is a family of German single and two-place paragliders that was designed and produced by UP Europe of Kochel am See. Introduced in 2003, production of the final version ended in 2016.

Design and development
The Kantega was designed as an intermediate glider.

The design progressed through several generations of models, the Kantega, Kantega 2, Kantega XC and Kantega XC2. The models are each named for their relative size.

Variants

Kantega
Produced from 2003 to 2005.
Kantega S
Small-sized model for lighter pilots. The glider model is Deutscher Hängegleiterverband e.V. (DHV) 1-2 certified.
Kantega M
Mid-sized model for medium-weight pilots. The glider model is DHV 1-2 certified.
Kantega L
Large-sized model for heavier pilots. The glider model is DHV 1-2 certified.
Kantega XL
Extra large-sized model for heavier pilots. The glider model is DHV 1-2 certified.

Kantega 2
Produced from 2006 to 2008.
Kantega 2 XS
Extra small-sized model for lighter pilots. The glider model is DHV 1-2 certified.
Kantega 2 S
Small-sized model for lighter pilots. The glider model is DHV 1-2 certified.
Kantega 2 M
Mid-sized model for medium-weight pilots. The glider model is DHV 1-2 certified.
Kantega 2 L
Large-sized model for heavier pilots. The glider model is DHV 1-2 certified.
Kantega 2 XL
Extra large-sized model for much heavier pilots. The glider model is DHV 1-2 and tandem certified.

Kantega XC
Produced from 2010 to 2012.
Kantega 2 XS
Extra small-sized model for lighter pilots. The glider model is DHV LTF B/EN B certified.
Kantega 2 S
Small-sized model for lighter pilots. The glider model is DHV LTF B/EN B certified.
Kantega 2 M
Mid-sized model for medium-weight pilots. The glider model is DHV LTF B/EN B certified.
Kantega 2 L
Large-sized model for heavier pilots. The glider model is DHV LTF B/EN B certified.

Kantega XC2
Produced from 2012 to 2016.
Kantega 2 XS
Extra small-sized model for lighter pilots. The glider model is DHV LTF/EN B certified.
Kantega 2 S
Small-sized model for lighter pilots. The glider model is DHV LTF/EN B certified.
Kantega 2 M
Mid-sized model for medium-weight pilots. The glider model is DHV LTF/EN B certified.
Kantega 2 L
Large-sized model for heavier pilots. The glider model is DHV LTF/EN B certified.

Specifications (Kantega M)

References

External links

Kantega
Paragliders